Inanidrilus wasseri is a species of annelid worm. It is known from subtidal sands near the Lizard Island in the northern part of the Great Barrier Reef. Preserved specimens measure  in length. The specific name wasseri honours Mr Robert Wasser, a maintenance officer at the Lizard Island Research Station.

References

wasseri
Taxa named by Christer Erséus
Fauna of the Pacific Ocean
Animals described in 1984